The Feast is a 1949 novel by the British writer Margaret Kennedy. It is a modern reworking of the seven deadly sins. Her ninth novel, it was her first in more than a decade. It was a Literary Guild choice in America.

Synopsis
In a Cornish coastal resort town a landslide of a nearby cliff buries a hotel, killing those inside but sparing those who have gone out on a picnic excursion.

References

Bibliography
 Hammill, Faye. Women, Celebrity, and Literary Culture Between the Wars. University of Texas Press, 2007.
 Humble, Nicola. The Feminine Middlebrow Novel, 1920s to 1950s: Class, Domesticity, and Bohemianism. Oxford University Press, 2004.
 Vinson, James. Twentieth-Century Romance and Gothic Writers. Macmillan, 1982.
 Stringer, Jenny & Sutherland, John. The Oxford Companion to Twentieth-century Literature in English. Oxford University Press, 1996.

1949 British novels
Novels by Margaret Kennedy
Novels set in Cornwall
Cassell (publisher) books